See also Range Creek in Utah
Range Creek is a tributary of the Elm Fork of the Trinity River in Texas. It rises just a few miles from the Red River in Grayson County. It reaches its mouth at Lake Ray Roberts, a reservoir formed by a dam on the Elm Fork.

See also
List of rivers of Texas

External links
 
Lake Ray Roberts

Rivers of Texas
Bodies of water of Grayson County, Texas